According to human rights organisations, the government of the UAE violates a number of fundamental human rights. The UAE does not have democratically elected institutions and citizens do not have the right to change their government or to form political parties. Activists and academics who criticize the regime are detained and imprisoned, and their families are often harassed by the state security apparatus. There are reports of forced disappearances in the UAE; many foreign nationals and Emirati citizens have been abducted by the UAE government and illegally detained and tortured in undisclosed locations. In numerous instances, the UAE government has tortured people in custody (especially expatriates and political dissidents),
and has denied their citizens the right to a speedy trial and access to counsel during official investigations.

According to Human Rights Watch, the UAE detains those who criticize authorities, including hundreds of activists and academics, and Emirati laws discriminate against women, migrants and LGBT individuals.

Flogging and stoning are legal forms of judicial punishment in the UAE due to Sharia courts. The government restricts freedom of speech and freedom of the press, and the local media are censored to avoid criticising the government, government officials or royal families. As a result, the UAE routinely ranks near the bottom of many international measures for human rights and press freedom.

Despite being elected to the UN Council, the UAE has not signed most international human-rights and labour-rights treaties, including the International Covenant on Civil and Political Rights, the International Covenant on Economic, Social and Cultural Rights, and the Convention on the Protection of the Rights of All Migrant Workers and Members of Their Families. In November 2020, the United Arab Emirates overhauled its legal system to loosen restrictions on alcohol consumption, permit cohabitation, and increase penalty for honor killings, among other changes.

Capital punishment

Although authorised, the death penalty is rarely applied in the UAE as the law requires that a panel of three judges agree on the decision of a sentence to death, which can be commuted if the family of the victim forgives the convicted or accept a financial compensation for the crime. When a family accepts financial compensation, a court can jail a convict to a minimum of three years and a maximum of seven years.
 
Since the law in the UAE is based on a dual system of Shari'a and civil courts execution, death by stoning may be ruled on only if confession and four witnesses are obtained which is legally binding for a stoning sentence to be carried out, however UAE has so far never carried out any death-by-stoning sentence.
 
Execution in the UAE is applied mainly through a firing squad.

Sharia law
The legal system in the UAE is based on a hard-line interpretation of Sharia law.

Flogging and stoning

The UAE's judicial system is derived from the civil law system and Sharia law. The court system consists of civil courts and Sharia courts. According to Human Rights Watch, UAE's civil and criminal courts apply elements of Sharia law, codified into its criminal code and family law, in a way which discriminates against women.

Flogging is a punishment for criminal offences such as adultery, premarital sex, and alcohol consumption. Due to Sharia courts, flogging is legal with sentences ranging from 80 to 200 lashes. Verbal abuse pertaining to a person's sexual honour is illegal and punishable by 80 lashes if it happened in public and at least one witness testify. Between 2007 and 2014, many people in the UAE were sentenced to 100 lashes. More recently in 2015, two men were sentenced to 80 lashes for hitting and insulting a woman. In 2014, an expat in Abu Dhabi was sentenced to 80 lashes for alcohol consumption and raping a toddler. Alcohol consumption for Muslims is illegal and punishable by 80 lashes; many Muslims have been sentenced to 80 lashes for alcohol consumption. Sometimes 40 lashes are given.

Illicit sex is sometimes penalised by 60 lashes. 80 lashes is the standard amount for anyone sentenced to flogging in several emirates. Sharia courts have penalised domestic workers with floggings. In October 2013, a Filipino housemaid was sentenced to 100 lashes for theft committed after her employer discovered her illegitimate pregnancy. Drunk-driving is strictly illegal and punishable by 80 lashes; many expats have been sentenced to 80 lashes for drunk-driving. In Abu Dhabi, a man has been sentenced to 80 lashes for being drunk while with his girlfriend on the Corniche. Under UAE law, premarital sex is punishable by 100 lashes. The law has been changed to exclude expats.

Stoning is a legal punishment in the UAE. In May 2014, an Asian housemaid was sentenced to death by stoning in Abu Dhabi. In 2006, an expatriate was sentenced to death by stoning for committing adultery. Between 2009 and 2013, several people were sentenced to death by stoning. However, all sentences have been overturned on appeal after they retracted their confession (requirement for stoning) and no stoning has been carried out.

Abortion is illegal and punishable by a maximum penalty of 100 lashes and up to five years in prison. In recent years, several people have retracted their guilty plea in illicit sex cases after being sentenced to stoning or 100 lashes which is why no stoning is carried out. The punishment for committing adultery is 100 lashes for unmarried people and stoning to death for married people.

Apostasy from Islam

Apostasy from Islam is a crime punishable by death in the UAE. Blasphemy is illegal, expats involved in insulting Islam are liable for deportation. UAE incorporates hudud crimes of Sharia into its Penal Code – apostasy being one of them. Article 1 and Article 66 of UAE's Penal Code requires hudud crimes to be punished with the death penalty. No one has been executed for apostasy.

Emirati women and Islamic women
Emirati women must receive permission from male guardian to marry and remarry. The requirement is derived from Sharia, and has been federal law since 2005. In all emirates, it is illegal for Muslim women to marry non-Muslims. In the UAE, a marriage union between a Muslim woman and non-Muslim man is punishable by law, since it is considered a form of fornication.

Homosexuality

Homosexuality is illegal and is a crime that is punishable with death, life in prison, floggings, fines, deportation, chemical castration, forced psychological treatments, honor killings, vigilante executions, beatings, forced anal examinations, forced hormone injections, and torture.

Public affection
Kissing in public is illegal and can result in deportation. Expats in Dubai have been deported for kissing in public. In Abu Dhabi, people have been sentenced to 80 lashes for kissing in public and being drunk.

Family law

The Sharia-based personal status law regulates matters such as marriage, divorce and child custody. The Sharia-based personal status law is applied to Muslims and sometimes non-Muslims. Non-Muslim expatriates are liable to Sharia rulings on marriage, divorce and child custody. Sharia courts have exclusive jurisdiction to hear family disputes, including matters involving divorce, inheritances, child custody, child abuse and guardianship of minors. Sharia courts may also hear appeals of certain criminal cases including rape, robbery, driving under the influence of alcohol and related crimes.

Other laws

Article 1 of the Federal Penal Code states that "provisions of the Islamic Law shall apply to the crimes of doctrinal punishment, punitive punishment and blood money." The Federal Penal Code repealed only those provisions within the penal codes of individual emirates which are contradictory to the Federal Penal Code. Hence, both are enforceable simultaneously.

A federal law in the UAE prohibits swearing in WhatsApp and penalises swearing by a $68,061 fine and imprisonment; expats are penalised by deportation. In July 2015, an Australian expat was deported for swearing on Facebook.

Legal punishments in the UAE include forced amputations and flogging.

During the month of Ramadan, it is illegal to eat, drink, or smoke in public between sunrise and sunset. Exceptions are made for pregnant women and children. The law applies to both Muslims and non-Muslims, and failure to comply results in arrest.

Forced disappearances and torture
In numerous instances, the UAE government has tortured people in custody (especially expats and political dissidents).
UAE authorities are known to be using torture as a means to extract forced confessions of guilt.
UAE has escaped the Arab Spring; however, more than 100 Emirati activists were jailed and tortured because they sought reforms. Since 2011, the UAE government has increasingly carried out forced disappearances. Many foreign nationals and Emirati citizens have been arrested and abducted by the state, the UAE government denies these people are being held (to conceal their whereabouts), placing these people outside the protection of the law. According to Human Rights Watch, the reports of forced disappearance and torture in the UAE are of grave concern.

The Arab Organisation of Human Rights has obtained testimonies from many defendants, for its report on "forced disappearance and Torture in the UAE", who reported that they had been kidnapped, tortured and abused in detention centres. The report included 16 different methods of torture including severe beatings, threats with electrocution and denying access to medical care.

In 2013, 94 Emirati activists were held in secret detention centres and put on trial for allegedly attempting to overthrow the government. Human rights organisations have spoken out against the secrecy of the trial. An Emirati, whose father is among the defendants, was arrested for tweeting about the trial. In April 2013, he was sentenced to 10 months in jail.

Repressive measures were also used against non-Emiratis in order to justify the UAE government's claim that there is an "international plot" in which UAE citizens and foreigners were working together to destabilise the country. Foreign nationals were also subjected to a campaign of deportations. There are many documented cases of Egyptians and other foreign nationals who had spent years working in the UAE being given only a few days to leave the country.

Foreign nationals subjected to forced disappearance include two Libyans and two Qataris. Amnesty reported that the Qatari men had been abducted by the UAE government that withheld information about the men's fate from their families. Among the foreign nationals detained, imprisoned and expelled is Iyad El-Baghdadi, a popular blogger and Twitter personality. He was arrested by UAE authorities, detained, imprisoned and then expelled from the country. Despite his lifetime residence in the UAE, as a Palestinian citizen, El-Baghdadi had no recourse to contest this order. He could not be deported back to the Palestinian territories, therefore he was deported to Malaysia.

In 2012, Dubai police subjected three British citizens to beatings and electric shocks after arresting them on drugs charges. The British Prime Minister, David Cameron, expressed "concern" over the case and raised it with the UAE President, Sheikh Khalifa bin Zayed Al Nahyan, during his 2013 state visit to Britain. The three men were pardoned and released  in July 2013.

In April 2009, a video tape of torture was smuggled out of the UAE showed Sheikh Issa bin Zayed Al Nahyan torturing a man with whips, electric cattle prods, and wooden planks with protruding nails, and running him over repeatedly with a car.

In December 2009, Issa appeared in court and proclaimed his innocence. The trial ended on 10 January 2010, when Issa was cleared of the torture of Mohammed Shah Poor. Human Rights Watch criticised the trial and called on the government to establish an independent body to investigate allegations of abuse by UAE security personnel and other persons of authority. The US State Department expressed concern over the verdict and said all members of Emirati society "must stand equal before the law" and called for a careful review of the decision to ensure that the demands of justice are fully met in this case.

According to Human Rights Watch annual report 2016, Emirates authorities forcibly disappeared and detained people who criticised the government or its allies. In February 2015, Human Rights Watch documented a case in which three Emirati sisters, Asma, Mariam, and Al Yazzyah al-Suweidi, were forcibly disappeared by Emirates authorities. They released them without charge after spending three months in incommunicado detention. The three sisters were arrested after posting comments criticising the government for arresting their brother Dr. Issa al-Suweidi. In August 2015, Emirati academic Nasser bin Ghaith was arrested after posting some comments on social media in which he criticised the mass killing of Rab'a protesters in Cairo in 2013. Bin Ghaith's fate was still unknown at time of writing.

According to Amnesty International annual report (2016) on Human Rights in UAE, enforced disappearance has been widely practiced against citizen and foreign nationals in UAE. The international organisation said UAE government has forcibly disappeared dozens of people for months in secret and unacknowledged detention for interrogation. According to the report, Abdulrahman Bin Sobeih was subjected to enforced disappearance for three months by UAE authorities. In addition, Dr Nasser Bin Ghaith, an academic and economist, was forcibly disappeared by the authorities for more than 10 months. Bin Ghaith was subjected to torture and ill-treatment as he faced charges relating to his right to freedom of expression.

November 2017, Abu Dhabi security forces arrested two journalists covering the opening of the Louvre Abu Dhabi museum for Swiss public broadcaster. The journalists were held for more than 50 hours, with no ability to communicate with the outside world. According to RTS, The journalists were interrogated for up to nine hours at a time, and were blindfolded as they were shuttled between different locations. Furthermore, their camera, computers, hard drives and other material were confiscated.

In March 2018, an Emirati princess Latifa bint Mohammed Al Maktoum II, daughter of Sheikh Mohammed bin Rashid al-Maktoum, was seized by commandos from a yacht away from the Indian coast, after she fled from UAE. A BBC documentary reported how the princess planned her escape from her residential palace. In a video recorded by Latifa prior to her escape, she claimed to have tried escaping from the UAE previously. However, she was captured at the border and jailed for three years; beaten and tortured. In December, a statement released by her family quoted that the princess was "safe" at her home. Since early March, the whereabouts of the princess were unknown. On 5 March 2020, a UK family court's 34-page ruling confirmed that Sheikha Shamsa bint Mohammed al-Maktoum and Sheikha Latifa bint Mohammed al-Maktoum had been abducted and forcibly detained by their father and the Dubai ruler, Sheikh Mohammed bin Rashid Al Maktoum.

A number of UAEs royals have been charged for abusing and ill-treating servants in overseas countries.

In 2019, a 42-year-old Emirati woman, who was arrested in 2015 by the UAE authorities, grabbed media attention due to the ill-treatment she received during her imprisonment in the UAE. While raising funds for Syrian refugees, Alia Abdel Nour was arrested on the accusations of funding terrorism. She has been imprisoned for 10 years, subjected to immense torture and solitary confinement, with no access to ventilation, toilet, mattress, blanket, proper food and medicine. Despite being diagnosed with cancer – shortly after her arrest - she did not receive any medical treatment. Emirati authorities claim that Nour herself declined the medical treatment, while her family claims she was forced to sign documents that forbid her access to the treatment.

On 4 May 2019, Alia Abdel Nour died in the UAE prison following prolonged mistreatment and denial of medical care by the Emirati authorities. Since her arrest, her hands and feet were shackled to her hospital bed for long periods of time. The UAE authorities ignored requests by the international rights groups, European parliamentarians, and United Nations experts to release her on the grounds of her deteriorating health.

In January 2019, the UAE police detained 26-year-old Ali Issa Ahmad for reportedly wearing a T-shirt with Qatar's flag on it after the Qatar vs Iraq AFC Asian Cup match in Abu Dhabi. Ahmad complains that the FIFA "failed to protect" his human rights. Pictures of scars on Ahmad's body from the torture sustained during detention were released by BBC. The victim complained about racial discrimination and of being stabbed and deprived of food and water while inside the prison. Complaints have been registered against FIFA as well as directed to UAE authorities through the Foreign and Commonwealth Office (FCO) and the UN Human Rights Council. According to UAE authorities, the police took Ahmed to a hospital to be examined for signs of abuse, which he complained of to the police — as is customary in cases of assault in the UAE. A medical report revealed that his injuries were inconsistent with the account of events he gave to police, and that his wounds were self-inflicted. UAE embassy in Britain denied the news allegations that he was arrested for wearing a Qatari shirt, stating "He was categorically not arrested for wearing a Qatar football shirt". Ahmed was charged for wasting police time and filing a false report, which is an illegal act. During the AFC Asian Cup, fans were seen wearing the Qatari football shirt and waving Qatari flags without any instances of arrest.

In June 2020, it was reported that the UAE had been holding captive a Turkish aid worker Mehmet Ali Ozturk, since 2018. Reportedly, Ali Ozturk has been detained on frivolous grounds and was tortured inside UAE's prison. He was arrested in Dubai, where he, alongside his wife Emine Ozturk, was participating in Dubai's food festival. "He lost 25kg after the torture they subjected him to, from denailing to strappado. They would do these things when he refused to take part in a video accusing Erdogan of some crimes," his wife quoted. In 2017, a Yemen human rights activist Huda Al-Sarari exposed a UAE secret detention facility in Yemen where thousands of Emiratis were held and tortured. Al-Sarari was forced into exile.

On 9 July 2020, reports claimed that the UAE authorities declined the requests of human rights organisations to provide information about an Omani man, Abdullah al-Shaamsi, who was sentenced to life imprisonment in May 2020 on a seriously unfair trial. Al-Shaamsi was arrested in 2018 at the age of 19, while attending high school in the UAE. The security forces subjected him to a sustained period of detention without communication, solitary confinement and torture, leaving him with kidney cancer and depression. Despite his health conditions, he was being held in an overcrowded prison known for unsanitary conditions and lack of access to adequate health care, during the COVID-19 crisis.

Since October 2020, UAE authorities on basis of religious background have forcibly disappeared at least four Pakistani men and deported at least six others. Reports of UAE authorities arbitrarily targeting Shia residents, whether Lebanese, Iraqi, Afghan, Pakistani, or otherwise, often emerge at times of increased regional tensions.

In March 2021, the US State Department released a report on the human rights practices in the UAE. It highlighted that while the disappearance cases and unlawful killings were not reported to media throughout 2020, there were cases of torture, arbitrary detentions, abuses, threats of rape, and beatings. The department reported the conditions of Emirati prisons, which remained overcrowded, had poor sanitary conditions and provided no easy access to medical care, during the COVID-19 pandemic. The UAE prisons were described as extremely torturous, where prisoners were discriminated against and abused using various ways. The detainees were in most cases not provided with the details of their case for months, while many receive the charges written in Arabic with no translation and forced to sign such documents.

In July 2021, a private letter written by prominent human rights defender Ahmed Mansoor, detailing his mistreatment in detention and grossly unfair trial, was published by a London-based Arabic news site. Despite having ratified the UN Convention against Torture and Other Cruel, Inhuman or Degrading Treatment or Punishment in 2012, the UAE grossly violated the act's obligations by holding Mansoor in isolation for at least four years, amounting to physical and mental torture.

In September 2021, the UAE sentenced an activist from Syria, Abdul Rahman Al-Nahhas, to ten years in prison. Founder of the Insan Watch Organization, the human rights activist was charged by the Public Prosecutor of terrorism for his alleged membership in a terrorist organization as he was linked with the Switzerland-based Al-Karama Organisation for Human Rights. Al-Nahhas was also charged for insulting the prestige of the state by approaching the French embassy seeking political asylum. He was arrested at the end of 2019 and was forcibly disappeared by the UAE authorities until the commencement of his trial in January 2021. During his detention, Al-Nahhas was threatened, tortured, and was not allowed to contact his family.

On 1 October 2021, lawyers submitted a complaint to the French Prosecutor in Paris against Major General Ahmed Naser Al-Raisi for the unlawful detention and torture of two British men, Matthew Hedges and Ali Issa Ahmad. Al-Raisi has been a controversial candidate for the presidency of international policing body Interpol. The complaint against him was made under the principle of universal jurisdiction, allowing the French authorities to investigate and arrest foreign nationals for certain crimes even if they occurred outside France.

In 2021, Ahmed Naser, a UAE senior Policeman was made the chief of Interpol. He has allegedly tortured a number of people in the UAE before.

On 7 January 2022, the Human Rights Watch reported that Emirati authorities penalised human rights defender Ahmed Mansoor after he published a prison letter detailing his mistreatment in detention in July 2021. The UAE authorities held Mansoor largely incommunicado and denied him access to critical medical care. The UAE violated Mansoor’s rights for many years with arbitrary arrest and detention, death threats, physical assault, government surveillance, and inhumane treatment in custody.

A British businessman, Ryan Cornelius was being held arbitrarily by the authorities in the UAE since 2008. He was arrested from Dubai airport and was detained after some complicated business dealings with influential Emiratis. In 2010, he was sentenced to 10 years in prison after charges of fraud. The UAE authorities sentenced him for additional 20 years, two months before his release date in 2018. Cornelius contracted tuberculosis in detention. He was subjected to human rights abuses, including aggressive interrogations in absence of legal representative and prolonged solitary confinement. In June 2022, the UN officials shed light on the issue and called on the UAE to immediately release Cornelius. Cornelius’ family had been campaigning for his release. In September 2022, the family urged multiple foreign investors to divest their holdings in the Dubai Islamic Bank, which applied to extend Cornelius’ sentence. His wife, Heather Cornelius asked BlackRock “to divest yourself of your holdings in the DIB”. In her letter, she urged the fund manager to use its influence in DIB “to compel them to take all necessary steps to secure the release of my husband.” She wrote similar letters to lender JPMorgan, US investment manager Vanguard, British wealth manager St James’s Place and Norway’s sovereign wealth fund Norges Bank Investment Management.

The UAE authorities were keeping a woman, Amina Al Abdouli in detention since 2015, and was being held even after her sentence came to an end. In 2016, she was sentenced to 5 years in prison for charges, including “inciting hatred against the State and disturbing public order; undermining the reputation of the State institutions and publishing false information to endanger the State’s relations with its allies”. She was also faced a fine of 500,000 AED, in addition to no right of appeal. In 2021, she was sentenced for another three years for “publishing information that disturbs the public order”. During her sentence, Abdouli’s mental and physical health suffered severely. Besides, she was subjected to acts of torture, including being beaten, stripped naked, blind-folded, bound at the feet, and sleep deprived.

Prisons
The UAE runs secret prisons in Yemen where prisoners are forcibly disappeared and tortured.

On 10 June 2020, Human Rights Watch urged UAE authorities to take care of the mental and physical health of prisoners due to the ongoing COVID-19 outbreak in three detention facilities.

The United States has sent some prisoners to the UAE; these prisoners were held inside Guantanamo Bay jail and they were tortured again. Many of these prisoners were only suspects.

A British football coach, Billy Hood was detained by the Dubai authorities and sentenced to ten years in prison over CBD vape oil left in his car by a visiting friend. Hood suffered rough prison conditions, where he was isolated in a tiny cell. During February 2022 visit of Prince William to the UAE for Dubai Expo 2020, Hood was “violently attacked” by four Emirati prison guards after he punched the wall of his jail cell out of “frustration”. The assault against Billy Hood was completely opposite to Prince William’s efforts to promote ties between the two nations.

On 28 January 2022, the Emirati authorities arrested Steve Long, a war veteran from Stockport, for telling the Etihad Airlines staff he feared there was a bomb on his plane, after a psychotic breakdown. A court in Abu Dhabi didn’t accept the medical evidence. Long was diagnosed with acute psychosis and delirium days after he was arrested. He was also ordered to pay £100,000, and was supposed to be jailed unless he paid the money. His family appealed the verdict but it was rejected, despite two medical reports saying Steve lacked capacity at the time and is not responsible for his actions. His family members believed that a drone strike in Abu Dhabi in January 2022 heightened his fears and triggered a mental collapse.

On 17 July 2022, the UAE authorities unjustly arrested US citizen Asim Ghafoor, the former lawyer of murdered journalist Jamal Khashoggi, and sentenced him to three years in prison. Ghafoor is also a co-founder and board member of human rights group Democracy for the Arab World Now (DAWN). The Abu Dhabi Money Laundering Court convicted Ghafoor of committing crimes of tax evasion and money laundering, and also ordered him to pay a fine of more than $800,000 stemming from his in absentia conviction. But the critics and human rights defenders believe that Ghafoor’s detention is politically motivated revenge for his association with Khashoggi and DAWN, which has highlighted UAE human rights abuses and war crimes. Ghafoor has stated that he had no knowledge of any legal matter against him and no reason to believe he was involved in any legal dispute in the UAE.

Freedom of speech
In the UAE, there is no formal commitment to free speech. It is not permitted to be in any way critical of the government, government officials, police and the royal families. Any attempt to also form a union in public and protest against any issue, will be met with severe action. Free speech restrictions apply to critics, as well as to ordinary social media users.

On 16 November 2007 Tecom stopped broadcast of two major Pakistani satellite news channels, uplinked from Dubai Media City, which was initially marketed by Tecom under the tagline "Freedom to Create". The Dubai government had ordered Tecom to shut down the popular independent Pakistani news channels Geo News and ARY One World on the demand of Pakistan's military regime led by General Pervez Musharraf. This was implemented by Du Samacom disabling their SDI & ASI streams. Later, policy makers in Dubai permitted these channels to air their entertainment programs, but news, current affairs and political analysis were forbidden. Although subsequently the conditions were removed, marked differences have since been observed in their coverage. This incident has had a serious impact on all organisations in the media city with Geo TV and ARY OneWorld considering relocation.

In 2013, the UAE arrested five men, including an American citizen for making a satirical video. The American, who had moved to Dubai for work, was sentenced to a year in prison.

Andrew Ross, a professor at New York University was not allowed to enter the UAE (where the university has a campus), after he had commented on the treatment of workers who built the campus there. Airline staff at the airport informed him that the UAE authorities told them that they will refuse him entry.

Amnesty International released a report about violating the right to freedom of expression in the United Arab Emirates. According to the report, a prominent economist, academic and human rights defender Dr Nasser bin Ghaith was sentenced to 10 years in jail by the Federal Appeal Court in Abu Dhabi. He was charged of posting false information on Twitter about UAE leaders and their policies; and the comments state that he had not been given a fair trial where he and four other Emirates prosecuted on charges of publicly insulting the countries' leaders over comments posted online. He was forcibly disappeared, held in secret detention for months and subjected to beatings and deliberate sleep deprivation.

Amnesty International published a report about violating the human rights in the United Arab Emirates. According to the report, a prominent human rights defender Ahmed Mansoor was arrested at 3:15 by 10 male and two female uniformed security officials. They raided the family's apartment, carried out a lengthy room-by-room search, including of the children's bedroom, and confiscated electronic devices. He was detained for the peaceful expression of conscientiously held belief.

Human Rights Watch issued a report regarding the violation of the rights to freedom of expression in the United Arab Emirates. On 15 March 2017, Tayseer Najjar, a Jordanian journalist, was sentenced to a three-year prison term and a fine of 500,000 UAE Dirhams by Abu Dhabi Federal Appeals Court. He was charged with insulting the state's symbols and criticising Egypt, Israel and Gulf countries through comments he made on Facebook during Israeli military operations in Gaza in 2014, before he moved to the UAE. Ten days after preventing him to travel to Jordan for his wife and children on 3 December 2015, UAE authorities summoned al-Najjar to a police station in Abu Dhabi and detained him. They also prevented him to contact with a lawyer for more than a year before bringing him to trial in January 2017.

Najjar was set to be released on 13 December 2018, after completing a three-year prison sentence. However, his sentence was extended for another six months as he failed to pay the substantial fine. Human Rights Watch and Reporters Without Borders urged Anwar Gargash, the UAE minister of state for foreign affairs, for an immediate release of the journalist. Sarah Leah Whitson, Director of Human Rights Watch said, "If the UAE were truly committed to its rhetoric of tolerance, it would not have ripped Najjar away from his wife and children for years-old innocuous Facebook posts."

Amnesty International issued a report regarding the violation of the right to freedom of speech in the United Arab Emirates. Hussain al-Najjar has served an 11-year prison sentence; he is one of a number of prisoners convicted in 2013 following the grossly unfair mass trial of 94 government critics and reform advocates. Accordingly, on 17 March 2014, the activist Osama al-Najjar who is a 28-year-old son of Hussain, was sentenced to three years in prison after sending tweets to the Minister of Interior expressing concern about his father who had been ill-treated in jail. During the detention, he was denied access to a lawyer for over six months and held in solitary confinement at a secret detention facility for four days after his arrest.

During the 2017 Qatar diplomatic crisis, Hamad Saif al-Shamsi, the Attorney-General of the United Arab Emirates announced on 7 June that publishing expressions of sympathy towards Qatar through social media, or any type of written, visual or verbal form is considered illegal under UAE's Federal Penal Code and the Federal law on Combating Information Technology Crimes. Violators of this offence face between 3 and 15 years imprisonment, a fine of up to 500,000 Emirati dirhams ($136,000) or both.

In March 2017, UAE's prominent economist, academic and human rights defender Dr Nasser bin Ghaith was arrested and imprisoned for 10 years, for his comments on Twitter related to the treatment he received during his previous arrest. Amnesty International condemned and criticised the arrest, asking for his immediate release – which is still pending. Ghaith went on a hunger strike in October 2018; his health has been deteriorating since then. Also, he was denied access to a lawyer during his trial period and still awaits justice.

According to Amnesty International, Israeli company NSO Group's Pegasus spyware was used to target human rights activist Ahmed Mansoor. citizen Lab's August 2016 report, "The Million Dollar Dissident", documents the attempts made to infect Mansoor's phone with Pegasus spyware.

On 20 March 2020, Amnesty International and the Gulf Centre for Human Rights wrote a joint-letter and called for the immediate and unconditional release of rights activist Ahmed Mansoor. The groups also called the UAE as an "incubator of tolerance".

In April 2020, the authorities in the United Arab Emirates introduced criminal penalties for the spread of misinformation and rumours related to the COVID-19 pandemic in the United Arab Emirates. On 11 May 2020, a US-based gulf rights group, Americans for Democracy and Human Rights in Bahrain in its report said that "impunity in the United Arab Emirates is endemic." Their study documented tactics used by Emirati authorities to stifle dissidents, besides revealing use of torture against those recognised as imminent threat to national security. "This ‘threat' most commonly includes human rights defenders, political opposition, religious figures, and journalists," a statement from the report read. In June 2020, International Campaign for Freedom in the UAE (ICFUAE) informed that the UAE continues to detain human rights activists who demanded democratic reform in the country. The campaign group stated Fahad al-Hijri, Abdallah Ali Alhajery, Oman Alharethy and Mahmoud Alhoseny, all have completed their sentences, but continued to remain imprisoned.

Alaa al-Siddiq, a UAE dissident and critic of the Kingdom of Saudi Arabia, allegedly died in a car crash in Oxfordshire, South East England. However, campaigners and a close colleague of Ms al-Siddiq have demanded the British police to thoroughly investigate the incident, claiming that the activist's "life was at risk all the time", Khalid Ibrahim, executive-director of the GCHR. Al Siddiq was a human rights activist, who had been fighting for the release of her father Mohammad al-Siddiq, also an activist, who had been detained since 2013. According to Mr Ibrahim, threat to the life of Al Siddiq heightened since her commencing work for the Saudi human rights firm, ALQST. Other passengers in the BMW car, two adults and a child, received injuries and were taken to the hospital for treatment.

On 16 September 2021, in a strongly worded resolution, European Union legislators condemned alleged human rights violations in the UAE and urged the government to free several prominent human rights activists and other "peaceful dissidents" imprisoned in the country.

As part of its clampdown on LGBT community, the Emirati authorities modified the code of conduct for school teachers, demanding them to avoid discussions around “gender identity, homosexuality or any other behavior deemed unacceptable to UAE society”. Teachers in the English-language international schools, majorly belonging to the UK and Ireland, said the “difficult” rules “worried” them during the classes. They remained under an added pressure because of the conservative parents. The educators were also instructed by the school management to remove rainbow flags and wristbands from the premises, while children were barred from discussing the subject of same-sex marriage and homosexuality.

Internet

In 2012, a cybercrime decree was issued, imposing severe restrictions on freedom of speech in social networking, blogs, text messages and emails. The law outlawed criticism of senior officials and demands for political reform. The law stipulates an imprisonment and a fine of up to 1,000,000 dirhams for publishing information which is deemed to be critical towards the state.

In 2015, a man was detained for commenting on his employer's Facebook page after a disagreement with his employer, even though the posts were made while the man was in the United States. Police in Abu Dhabi contacted him after he came back to the UAE and asked him to meet officers at a police station, where he was later detained.

Secret Dubai was an independent blog in Dubai, from 2002 until 2010. It generated a significant following in the Middle East Blogosphere until the UAE's Telecoms Regulatory Authority (TRA) in the UAE blocked the website.

In July 2016, Americans for Democracy and Human Rights in Bahrain released a report accusing UAE government of enacting further laws to restrict the freedom of political and social expression. According to the organisation, Federal Law No. 12 of 2016 inhibits social and political resistance, by constraining an individual's right to privacy and the right to freedom of expression. ADHR also said counter terrorism Laws in UAE are used to legalise arbitrary arrests, detainment, prosecution and imprisonment of peaceful protestors and government critics.

In 2018, Internet service providers in UAE blocked all VoIP apps, but permitting "government-approved VoIP apps (C'ME and BOTIM)". In opposition, a petition on Change.org garnered over 5000 signatures, in response to which the website was blocked in UAE.

In December 2019, the US intelligence identified that the UAE, which banned VoIP options on several applications, developed its own messaging and video calling app ToTok and has been using it as a spying tool. The country had forbidden the calling options on applications like WhatsApp, FaceTime and Skype, prompting suspicion over the self-developed app.

Freedom of religion

In recent years, a large number of Shia Muslim expatriates have been deported from the UAE, Lebanese Shia families have been deported for their alleged sympathy for Hezbollah. According to some organisations, more than 4,000 Shia expats have been deported from the UAE in recent years.

The lack of religious freedom in China has led to Uyghur Muslims fleeing the country to take refuge in other parts of the world. However, the diplomatic relations of Beijing have resulted in the abuse and detention of Uyghur Muslims even abroad. The government of UAE was reportedly one of the three Arab nations to have detained and deported Uyghur Muslims living in asylum in Dubai, back to China. The decision received a lot of criticism due to China's poor human rights records and no extradition agreement shared between the two countries.

The Uyghur community in Australia came forward in October 2022 to condemn the Muslim-majority nations. The countries, members of the United Nations Human Rights Council, were criticized for voting against a debate based on allegations of human rights abuses against them and the Muslims in Xinjian, China. Among the 19 member countries, the United Arab Emirates was one, which has been accused in the past for the detention and deportation of the vulnerable Uyghurs who found shelter in Dubai, back to China.

Women's rights
The United Arab Emirates ratified the Convention on the Elimination of all forms of Discrimination Against Women (CEDAW) in 2004. This Convention regards violence against women as a form of discrimination and calls on participating governments to put measures in place to combat violence in all forms, be it domestic or public. The UAE regularly participates in and hosts international and GCC conferences on women's issues. The UAE has signed several other international treaties on protecting the rights of women. Among these are the Convention on the Rights of a Child, the Hours of Work (Industry) Convention, the Equal Remuneration Convention, the Conventions Concerning Employment of Women During the Night and the Minimum Age Convention.

The 2015 United Nations Development Programme (UNDP) status report on Millennium Development Goals noted that the state legislations in the UAE do not discriminate on the basis of gender with respect to education, employment or the quality of services provided.

Through several initiatives women in the UAE are playing an increasingly important role in the economy, politics and technology and are viewed by some as leaders of gender equality in the Gulf region.

There is an alternative for women to dissolve their marriage found under article 110 of the Personal Status Code, or khul', however this means a woman relinquishes her right to the mahr – or the dowry she received as part of the marriage contract.

As to custody of children, women are considered physical guardians, they have the right to custody up to the age of 13 for girls and 10 for boys. But if a woman chooses to remarry she automatically forfeits her right to custody of her children. Current laws gives custody of children to the who is suitable.

Furthermore, under article 71, women who leave their husbands can be ordered to return to their marital home.

In November 2021, a report by The Independent highlighted the lack of fundamental protection of women’s rights in the UAE. British politicians — Sir Peter Bottomley, Debbie Abrahams and Helena Kennedy — generated a report based on the testimony of British women who experienced the UAE legal system. On the other side of the many reforms and PR experts laundering efforts, the Emirati laws still leave women vulnerable to serious abuses of their rights, with little legal recourse.

Violence against women

Domestic violence
In one case the Federal Court sanctioned a husband's beating of his wife so long as he did not leave physical marks and does so lightly, and in another case a man was ordered to pay a compensation for taking it too far by leaving physical injuries on his beaten wife.

Furthermore, there is growing concern at the UAE's lack of action against domestic violence. Human Rights Watch has documented three cases where it was alleged that police discouraged UK nationals from reporting cases of domestic violence.

On 24 March 2022, a senior British judge concluded that Sheikh Mohammed bin Rashid al-Maktoum inflicted 'exorbitant' domestic abuse on his ex-wife Princess Haya bint Hussein. Princess Haya was awarded the sole responsibility for their children by the High Court in London, in regards to their medical care and schooling. Sheikh Maktoum was barred from taking any decisions about the children’s lives and from having any direct contact with them. The court said that Sheikh Maktoum’s “coercive and controlling” behaviour could only have been “most harmful to the emotional and psychological welfare” of their children. As per the previous hearings, he spied on his second wife and her legal team by ordering their phones to be hacked using the Pegasus spyware.

Sexual assault and harassment
Women subjected to sexual assault crimes face several obstacles in seeking justice. They often face zina charges if they report a crime committed against them. Alicia Gali was imprisoned for eight months for sex outside of marriage after reporting an assault by her co-workers. A Norwegian woman was jailed for 16 months for reporting a rape before being pardoned and returned home. However, police said she was imprisoned for filling a false case as she had withdrawn her complaint.

The credibility of the victim's allegations are called into question by the police and Courts will enquire as to whether alcohol was involved, whether the alleged perpetrator was known, and whether the victim resisted the attack.

Migrant workers
According to the International Labour Organization there are 146,000 female migrant domestic workers employed in the UAE. In 2014 a Human Rights Watch report spoke to domestic workers who complained about abuse and not being paid due earnings, getting rest periods or days off and excessive workloads as well as documented some cases of psychological, physical and sexual abuse.

The kafala system ties a migrant worker to their employers, who act as their sponsors and makes it difficult for them to change employers. If a domestic worker attempts to leave her sponsor before the end of her contract without her sponsor's approval she will be deemed to have "absconded" which usually results in fines and deportation. however government has changed the law since then.

Federal law No.8 excludes domestic workers from labour laws and the environment which they work in is not regulated by the Ministry of Labour. This means domestic migrant workers have fewer rights than other migrant workers. In 2012 the government stated that the cabinet had approved a bill on domestic workers, however, Human Rights Watch has received no response to requests to obtain a draft.

In January 2016, Amnesty international said UAE government continues to violate rights of migrant workers in the country. The international organisation said workers have been tied with Kafalah system and denied collective bargaining rights. Amnesty also said that women workers from Asia and Africa are explicitly excluded from labour law protections and particularly vulnerable to serious abuses, including forced labour and human trafficking.

In March 2019, the Human Rights Watch reported that eight Lebanese nationals have been detained by the Emirati authorities on the accusations of terrorism charges, without any evidence. The defendants have been held in prolonged solitary confinement in an unknown location for more than a year, without any access to lawyers and family members. The detainees have also been forced to sign on blank papers while some of them were blindfolded.

In January 2020, Emirati employers were reported to have been hiring the Indian migrant workers on tourist visas, exploiting them and leaving them helpless with illegal status. Recruiters in the UAE chose visit visas because they are cheap and quickly available than the work permits.

A report in October 2022 revealed that the UAE refused to renew the work permits of thousands of Ugandan migrant workers and was forcefully deporting them. The Ugandan government confirmed that over 75,000 Ugandans were being considered illegal immigrants in UAE, after the Emirati government refused to renew their visa. Human rights organizations claimed that it was an example of the UAE’s racial discrimination against black migrant workers.

Employment
Women's employment in the labour market has risen significantly and in the public sector women make up 66% of employees, with 30% of them in high level positions of responsibility.

The UAE cabinet is made up of 27.5% women, all of whom play key roles in supporting innovation in the country with results indicating that the UAE is a new hub for women in technology. Women represent 50 percent of scientists in STEM programmes at UAE universities and female nationals in the nuclear sector have tripled between 2014 and 2015.

Political affairs
In 2004 the first woman was appointed as minister, Lubna Al Qasimi. In 2006, in the first parliamentary elections, the first woman was elected to the National Federal Council and in 2016, Noura Al Kaabi was named Minister of state for the NFC. Reem Al Hashimi and Shamma Al Mazrui are two other female ministers.

In addition to this the UAE is one of only two countries in the Gulf that permits women to hold the position of a judge or prosecutor, with Bahrain being the first country in the region to elect a female judge in 2006.

Abortion
Under article 340 of the Penal Code abortion is illegal in the UAE except where a woman's life is at risk or the unborn child has a genetic condition that will prove to be fatal. A woman who is found to have undergone an abortion can face a penalty of up to one year in prison and a fine up to Dh10,000. Women that enter hospital seeking treatment for a miscarriage can be accused of attempted abortion if they are unmarried.

Education
Education has been a prime area of growth in the whole Gulf region. Primary school completion rates have grown by 15% for girls and the UAE, as well as Qatar, have the highest female-to-male ratio of university enrolments worldwide. 77% of Emirati women enrol in higher education after secondary school and make up 70% of all university graduates in the UAE.

Traditionally women were encouraged to pursue female disciplines such as education and health care but this has changed recently with surges in areas such as technology and engineering. The UAE currently has four women fighter pilots and thirty trained females in the nation's special security forces. In September 2014, the UAE opened the region's first military college for women, Khawla bint Al Azwar Military School. The state-of-the-art military college provides world-class training, physical fitness sessions and leadership development.

Migrant and labour rights

Migrants, particularly migrant workers, make up a majority (approximately 80%) of the resident population of the UAE, and account for 90% of its workforce. They generally lack rights associated with citizenship and face a variety of restrictions on their rights as workers. There are reports of undocumented Emiratis who, because of their inability to be recognised as full citizens, receive no government benefits and have no labour rights. These stateless Emiratis – also known as bidun – either migrated to the UAE before independence or were natives who failed to register as citizens. In addition, there are various incidents where local individuals have ill-treated people from overseas, just on the basis of nationality or race.

Emiratis receive favourability in employment via the Emiratisation programme forcing companies by law to limit the number of migrant workers in a company. This is done for the purposes of stabilising the labour market and protecting the rights of this group as a minority in their own country. At the same time, however, due to the welfare benefits of the UAE government, many Emiratis are reluctant to take up low paying jobs especially those in the private sector; private sector employers are also generally more inclined to hire overseas temporary workers as they are cheaper and can be retrenched for various reasons, for example, if they go on strike Most UAE locals also prefer government jobs and consider private sector jobs to be below them.

Migrants, mostly of South Asian origin, constitute 42.5% of the UAE's workforce and have reportedly been subject to a range of human rights abuses. Workers have sometimes arrived in debt to recruitment agents from home countries and upon arrival were made to sign a new contract in English or Arabic that pays them less than had originally been agreed, although this is illegal under UAE law. Further to this, some categories of workers have had their passports withheld by their employer. This practice, although illegal, is to ensure that workers do not abscond or leave the country on un-permitted trips. In 2012, a workers' camp in Sonapur, Dubai, had their water cut for 20 days and electricity for 10 days, as well as no pay for three months. They were told that they had been forewarned that the lease was about to expire, and their option was to go to the Sharjah camp, which the workers did not want to do because it was "very dirty and [had] a foul smell.

 In September 2003 the government was criticised by Human Rights Watch for its inaction in addressing the discrimination against Asian workers in the emirate.
 In 2004, the United States Department of State has cited widespread instances of blue collar labour abuse in the general context of the United Arab Emirates.
 The BBC reported in September 2004 that "local newspapers often carry stories of construction workers allegedly not being paid for months on end. They are not allowed to move jobs and if they leave the country to go home they will almost certainly lose the money they say they are owed. The names of the construction companies concerned are not published in the newspapers for fear of offending the often powerful individuals who own them."
 In December 2005 the Indian consulate in Dubai submitted a report to the Government of India detailing labour problems faced by Indian expatriates in the emirate. The report highlighted delayed payment of wages, substitution of employment contracts, premature termination of services and excessive working hours as being some of the challenges faced by Indian workers in the city. The consulate also reported that 109 Indian blue collar workers committed suicide in the UAE in 2006.
 In March 2006, NPR reported that workers "typically live eight to a room, sending home a portion of their wage to their families, whom they don't see for years at a time." Others report that their wage has been withheld to pay back loans, making them little more than indentured servants.
 In 2007, 

 Human Rights Watch reported issues during construction of Louvre Abu Dhabi museum including the confiscation of workers passports resulting in forced labour conditions. High "recruitment loans" paid by migrant workers to construction companies still had not been repaid as of 2019, according to government-paid monitors. 86% of these fees were over $2000.
 In October 2020, Dubai witnessed a spike in number of homeless migrant workers. Blue collar workers from Asia and Africa claimed that they were trapped in the city after losing jobs, as the economy tightened due to COVID-19. Reports stated that many migrants gathered in the parks, as they were left abandoned with no money. It was also suggested that migrant workers from poorer countries were paid low wages, worked for long hours and often lived in cramped dormitories that were seen as coronavirus hotbeds in the UAE.

2006 workers' riots and 2007 strike by foreign workers

On 21 March 2006, tensions boiled over at the construction site of the Burj Khalifa, as workers upset over low wages and poor working conditions rioted, damaging cars, offices, computers, and construction tools. A Dubai Interior Ministry official said the rioters caused approximately US$1 million in damage. On 22 March most workers returned to the construction site but refused to work. Workers building a new terminal at Dubai International Airport went on strike in sympathy.

A strike by foreign workers took place in October 2007. Many were arrested, but almost all of them were released some days later.

Government action
In the past, the UAE government has denied any kind of labour injustices and has stated that the accusations by Human Rights Watch were misguided. Towards the end of March 2006, the government announced steps to allow construction unions. UAE labour minister Ali al-Kaabi said, "Laborers will be allowed to form unions."

The strikes and negative media attention provided exposure of this regional problem and in 2008 the UAE government decreed and implemented a "midday break" during summer for construction companies, ensuring laborers were provided several hours to escape the summer heat. Illegal visa overstayers were assured amnesty and even repatriated to their home countries at the expense of friends, embassies or charities.

In July 2013, a video was uploaded onto YouTube, which depicted a local driver hitting an expatriate worker, following a road related incident. Using part of his headgear, the local driver whips the expatriate and also pushes him around, before other passers-by intervene. A few days later, Dubai Police announced that both, the local driver and the person who filmed the video, have been arrested. It was also revealed that the local driver was a senior UAE government official, although the exact government department is not known. The video once again brings into question the way that lower classes of foreign workers are treated. Police in November 2013, also arrested a US citizen and some UAE citizens, in connection with a YouTube parody video which allegedly portrayed Dubai in bad light. The parody video was shot in areas of Satwa and depicted gangs learning how to fight using simple weapons, including shoes, the aghal, etc. During the UN Universal Periodic Review (UPR) Pre-session of 2017 addressing the human rights violation affairs, a UAE delegate, Ahmed Awad, departed from the session after pronouncing it as a "waste of time".

On 22 April 2020, Reuters reported that about hundreds of low-income migrant workers were seen queuing up across the road outside an Abu Dhabi hospital with the temperature outdoors exceeding 35 degrees Celsius, to get tested for Coronavirus. The tests were free of charge in the entire United Arab Emirates only if the person shows symptoms, has travel history, has come in contact with a positive case. However, if not, the test costs around 370 dirham ($100). The doctors confirmed a sharp daily increase in the number of positive cases specifically in the densely populated communities that house low-income group workers.

A report released by the Human Rights Watch in November 2020 cited that hundreds of Sudanese migrant workers were tricked into fighting alongside the UAE-backed forces loyal to General Khalifa Haftar in the Libya civil war. The Sudanese men were hired as security guards by an Emirati firm, Black Shield Security Services, for working at malls and hotels in the UAE.

Labour law issues
The UAE has four main types of labour laws:
 Federal Labour Law – Applies to all the seven Emirates and supersedes free zone laws in certain areas.
 JAFZA Labour Law – Applies to the Dubai Jebel Ali Free Zone.
 TECOM Labour Law – Applies to all Dubai Technology and Media Free Zone properties: Internet City, Media City, Studio City and International Media Production Zone.
 DIFC Labour Law – Applies to all companies in the Dubai International Financial Centre free zone.

Labour laws generally favour the employer and are less focused on the rights of employees. The Ministry of Labour is criticised for loosely enforcing these laws, most notably late or no wage or overtime payment for both blue collar and white collar employees.

How gratuity is calculated in the UAE
Working in the UAE as an employee or an employer is an enough reason to be aware of labour laws of the country regardless of employment status. Companies incorporated within UAE, be it mainland or free zones are bound to comply with the provisions of UAE Labour Law (Federal Law number 8 of 1980) which is further regulated through Ministry of Labour. Such provisions of the Labour Law oblige the employer to pay end of service benefits to the employee post expiration of his employment contract, subject to certain terms and conditions which shall be discussed in this article. End of service benefits is an extensive topic including variety of benefits wherein gratuity holds the biggest proportion thus, can be quite intimidating, considering multiple terms and conditions attached to calculating gratuity.

Human trafficking and prostitution

According to the Ansar Burney Trust (ABT), an illegal sex industry thrives in the emirates, where a large number of the workers are victims of human trafficking and sexual exploitation, especially in Dubai. This complements the tourism and hospitality industry, a major part of Dubai's economy.

Prostitution, though illegal by law, is conspicuously present in the emirate because of an economy that is largely based on tourism and trade. There is a high demand for women from Europe and Asia. According to the World Sex Guide, a website catering to sex tourists, Eastern European and Ethiopian women are the most common prostitutes, while Eastern European prostitutes are part of a well-organised trans-Oceanic prostitution network. The government has been trying to curb prostitution. In March 2007, it was reported that the UAE has deported over 4,300 sex workers mainly from Dubai.

The UAE government enshrines conservative values in its constitution and therefore has adopted significant measures to combat this regional problem. The government of the UAE has worked with law enforcement officials to build capacity and awareness through holding training workshops and implementing monitoring systems to report human rights violations. Despite this, the system led to registration of only ten human-trafficking related cases in 2007 and half as many penalised convictions.

Businesses participating in exploiting women and conducting illegal activities have licenses revoked and operations are forced to close. In 2007, after just one year, the efforts led to prosecution of prostitution cases rose by 30 percent. A year later, an annual report on the UAE's progress on human trafficking measures was issued and campaigns to raise public awareness of the issue are also planned. Internationally, the UAE has led various efforts in combating human trafficking, particularly with the main countries of origin. The state has signed numerous bilateral agreements meant to regulate the labour being sent abroad by ensuring transactions are conducted by labour ministries and not profiting recruitment agencies.

In 2020, International United Nations Watch released a report on trafficking to the Middle East from Europe. The documentation highlighted multiple patterns of trafficking and made a mention of how the number of Moldovan women and girls are being trafficked to the UAE. It also said that although the UAE has anti-trafficking measures in place, Dubai continues to be the "amusement park of the Arabian Peninsula".

Child camel jockeys

A 2004 HBO documentary accuses UAE citizens of illegally using child jockeys in camel racing, where they are subjected also to physical and sexual abuse. Anti-Slavery International has documented similar allegations.

The practice is officially banned in the UAE since the year 2002. The UAE was the first to ban the use of children under 15 as jockeys in the popular local sport of camel-racing when Sheikh Hamdan bin Zayed Al Nahyan, UAE's Deputy Prime Minister and Minister of State for Foreign Affairs announced the ban on 29 July 2002.

Announcing the ban, Sheikh Hamdan made it very clear that "no-one would be permitted to ride camels in camel-races unless they had a minimum weight of 45 kg, and are not less than 15 years old, as stated in their passports." He said a medical committee would examine each candidate to be a jockey to check that the age stated in their passport was correct and that the candidate was medically fit. Sheikh Hamdan said all owners of camel racing stables would be responsible for returning children under 15 to their home countries. He also announced the introduction of a series of penalties for those breaking the new rules. For a first offence, a fine of 20,000 AED was to be imposed. For a second offence, the offender would be banned from participating in camel races for a period of a year, while for third and subsequent offence, terms of imprisonment would be imposed.

The Ansar Burney Trust, which was featured heavily in the HBO documentary, announced in 2005 that the government of the UAE began actively enforcing a ban on child camel jockeys, and that the issue "may finally be resolved".

Victim support
Special funds to provide support for victims have been created such as Dubai's Foundation for the Protection of Women and Children, Abu Dhabi's Social Support Centre, the Abu Dhabi Shelter for Victims of Human Trafficking and the UAE Red Crescent Authority. Services offered include counseling, schooling, recreational facilities, psychological support and shelter. Mainly women and children receive assistance and in certain cases are even repatriated to their home countries.

See also

 Human rights in Dubai
 LGBT rights in the United Arab Emirates
 Freedom of religion in the United Arab Emirates
 Communications in the United Arab Emirates
 Emirates Centre for Human Rights
 Human rights in Islamic countries

References

External links
 Women in the United Arab Emirates: A Portrait of Progress (PDF)